Pruvot may refer to:

Fabien Pruvot, director of Japan (film), 2008
Georges Pruvot (1852–1924), French zoologist
Marie-Jane Pruvot, member of the European Parliament for France, 1979–84
Marie-Pierre Pruvot (born 1935), Algerian–French transgender showgirl

See also

Pruvotinidae, a family of molluscs
Alice Pruvot-Fol (1873–1972), French malacologist